Emeraude Ferries was a shipping company which operated vehicle and passenger ferries between the French city of Saint-Malo and the Channel Islands. The company ceased trading in May 2006 following strong competition and difficulties in finding a suitable vessel for the 2006 season.

History
Emeraude Ferries was founded in 1904 as Bateaux de la Côte d'Émeraude. In 1988 the company rebranded its ferry services as Emeraude Lines.

Competition arrived in March 2003 when Condor Ferries were granted a licence to carry cars from Jersey to St Malo. Previously only Emeraude Lines was permitted to carry cars and passengers to St Malo direct from Jersey. 
 
In November 2003 Emeraude Lines was purchased by the Sogestran Group. The company was renamed Emeraude Ferries.

References

Ferry companies of France
Defunct transport companies of France
1904 establishments in France
Transport companies established in 1904
Transport companies disestablished in 2006
French companies disestablished in 2006
French companies established in 1904